Brigance is a surname. Notable people with the surname include:

 Albert Brigance (died 2007), author and special education resource specialist
 O. J. Brigance (born 1969), American football player
 Tom Brigance (1913–1990), American fashion designer